{{Infobox magazine
| title = دابقDābiq
| image_file = Dabiq-English-number-one.jpg
| image_size = 200px
| image_caption = The English language edition of Dabiqs first issue "The Return of Khilafah".
| category = Online magazine for propaganda
| firstdate = 
| founder = Islamic State
| founded = 2014
| publisher = Al Hayat Media Center
| finaldate = 
| finalnumber = 15
| frequency = Variable; on average, one issue was published every 54 days
| country = Syria, Iraq
| based = Raqqa
| language = Arabic, English, German, French
}}Dabiq''' was an online magazine used by the Islamic State (IS) for Islamic radicalisation and recruitment purposes. It was first published in July 2014 in a number of different languages (including English). Dabiq itself states the magazine is for the purposes of unitarianism, truth-seeking, migration, holy war and community (tawhid, manhaj, hijrah, jihad and jama'ah respectively).

DetailsDabiq was published by IS via the deep web, although it was widely available online through other sources. The first issue carried the date "Ramadan 1435" in the Islamic Hijri calendar. According to the magazine, its name was taken from the town of Dabiq in northern Syria, which is mentioned in a hadith about Armageddon. IS believes Dabiq is where Muslim and infidel forces will eventually face each other, and that after the crusaders' forces are defeated, the apocalypse will begin. Every issue of Dabiq contained a quote attributed to Abu Musab al-Zarqawi: "The spark has been lit here in Iraq, and its heat will continue to by Allah's until it burns the crusader armies in Dabiq".

Harleen K. Gambhir of the Institute for the Study of War considered that while al-Qaeda in the Arabian Peninsula's magazine Inspire focuses on encouraging its readers to carry out lone-wolf attacks on the West, Dabiq was more concerned with establishing the religious legitimacy of IS and its self-proclaimed caliphate, and encouraging Muslims to emigrate there. In its October 2014 issue, an article outlined religious justifications for slavery and praised its revival."Islamic State Seeks to Justify Enslaving Yazidi Women and Girls in Iraq", Newsweek, 13 October 2014Allen McDuffee. (13 October 2014). "ISIS Is Now Bragging About Enslaving Women and Children", The Atlantic

IS used its Dabiq magazine to express its strong opposition to groups including Christians, Jews, Hindus, Shia Muslims and the Muslim Brotherhood.

In September 2016, IS replaced Dabiq with another online magazine, Rumiyah (Arabic for Rome''), published in English and other languages. Analysts speculated this was due to IS being driven out of the town of Dabiq by the Turkish Military and Syrian Rebels in October 2016. The new title refers to an Islamic prophecy about the fall of Rome.

Issues

See also
Dar al-Islam (magazine)
Konstantiniyye (magazine)
Istok (magazine)
Rumiyah (magazine)

Notes

References

2014 establishments in Syria
2016 establishments in Syria
Arabic-language magazines
Arabic-language websites
Defunct magazines published in Syria
English-language magazines
Irregularly published magazines
Islamic State of Iraq and the Levant mass media
Jihadist propaganda
Magazines established in 2014
Magazines disestablished in 2016
Magazines published in Syria
Online magazines
Propaganda newspapers and magazines